Suizhou, formerly Sui County, is a prefecture-level city in northern Hubei province, People's Republic of China, bordering Henan province to the north and east.

Etymology 
The Sui in Suizhou is derived from the ancient 'Suishizu' .

Administration 
The prefecture-level city of Suizhou administers 5 county-level divisions, including 1 district, 1 county-level city, 1 county and 2 other areas.

 Zengdu District
 Guangshui City
 Sui County
 Suizhou Economic Development Area
 Dahongshan Scenic Area

These are further divided into 54 township-level divisions, including 36 towns, 11 townships and 7 subdistricts.

History 

Suizhou has a long history. During the Spring and Autumn Period and Warring States Period (771−221 BCE), it was the territory of the State of Sui/Zeng and within the cultural sphere of the State of Chu. As a prefecture-level city Suizhou has a short history with its current status only granted by the State Council in June 2000.

Climate

Religion 
The Catholic minority is pastorally served by its own (dormant?) pre-diocesan Apostolic Prefecture of Suixian which is exempt, i.e. directly dependent on the Holy See (and its missionary Roman Congregation for the Evangelization of Peoples), not part of any ecclesiastical province.

It was established on 1937.06.17 as Apostolic Prefecture of Suixian / Suihsien / Suihsienen(sis) (Latin adjective), on territory split off from the Apostolic Vicariate of Hankou.
 
It is vacant since 1951, without apostolic administrator since 1981, having had only the following incumbents :
 Father Patrick Maurice Connaughton, Friars Minor (O.F.M.) (born Ireland) (1937.06.17 – retired 1951.03), died 1967
 ''Apostolic Administrator Friar Dominic Chen Te-mien, O.F.M. (1951.04.05 – 1981), no ther Ordinariate.

Transport
Suizhou is served by the Hankou–Danjiangkou Railway.

See also 
 List of Catholic dioceses in China

References

Sources and external links 

 Government website of Suizhou 
 GCatholic

 
Cities in Hubei
Prefecture-level divisions of Hubei